Avery D. Andrews (April 4, 1864 – April 19, 1959) was an officer in the United States Army and a corporate attorney and executive.  He was most prominent for his service as a brigadier general on the staff of the American Expeditionary Forces headquarters during World War I.

A native New York state's North Country, Andrews graduated from the United States Military Academy in 1886, and was a classmate of John J. Pershing.  He served as an artillery officer, and was appointed aide-de-camp to John Schofield, whose daughter he married in 1888.  After graduating with law degrees from Columbian University and New York Law School, Andrews resigned from the army and became a successful corporate attorney and executive in New York City.  He returned to the army for the Spanish–American War, and served as Adjutant General of New York during the governorship of Theodore Roosevelt.

Andrews again returned to the army for World War I; he attained the rank of brigadier general, and his service culminated with assignment as Assistant Chief of Staff for Personnel (C-1) on the headquarters staff of the American Expeditionary Forces.  After the war, Andrews remained a brigadier general in the Organized Reserve Corps until retiring in 1926.  He practiced law until retiring to Florida in 1943.

In 1934, Andrews published a Pershing biography.  He died in Florida in 1959, and was buried at Arlington National Cemetery.

Early life 
Avery Delano Andrews was born in Massena, New York on April 4, 1864, the son of Hannibal and Harriet (Delano) Andrews.  He was educated in Massena, and attended Williston Seminary from 1881 to 1882.  In 1882, Andrews began attendance at the United States Military Academy, from which he graduated in 1886, the same class which included John J. Pershing.  Andrews was commissioned a second lieutenant in the 5th Artillery, and served at Fort Columbus on Governors Island, New York.

Early career 
Andrews was on special duty at Headquarters, Division of the Atlantic in 1888.  From 1889 to 1892 he was aide-de-camp to Lieutenant General John Schofield, the Commanding General of the United States Army.  He was promoted to first lieutenant in 1892.  While serving as Schofield's aide, Andrews received a LL.B. degree from Columbian University (now George Washington University Law School).  In 1892 he received an LL.B. from New York Law School.  Andrews was admitted to the bar in New York, and resigned from the Army in 1893.

Continued career
Andrews established a successful law practice in New York City as a partner in the firm of Wells and Andrews.  He was also an officer and director of several corporations including general counsel and vice president for Barber Asphalt Paving Company; American representative for the Royal Dutch Shell Petroleum Company; Director of Irving Trust Company; and Director of Central National Bank.  In 1895 he was appointed to New York City's Board of Police Commissioners by Mayor William L. Strong.  Andrews served as treasurer of the board while Theodore Roosevelt was its president.

Spanish–American War
After resigning from the Army, Andrews was appointed Engineers officer on the staff of the New York National Guard's 1st Brigade, and commissioned as a major.  In 1898 he was appointed commander of Squadron A, a separate unit of the New York National Guard.  When the Spanish–American War began in 1898, Andrews was commissioned a lieutenant colonel in the United States Volunteers, and assigned as chief quartermaster and assistant inspector general on the staff of 1st Division, Sixth Army Corps, which was commanded by Major General James H. Wilson.

In 1899, Andrews was appointed Adjutant General of New York by Theodore Roosevelt, who had won the 1898 election for governor.  Andrews was promoted to brigadier general in the National Guard, and he served as adjutant general until 1900.

Post-Spanish–American War
After the war, Andrews returned to his law practice and business interests, and was recognized as an expert in federal and state laws pertaining to the railroad, oil, and banking industries.

World War I

When the United States entered World War I in 1917, Andrews was appointed Director of Military Service for the state of Pennsylvania's Committee of Public Safety.  In October of that year he resigned as director in order to return to active military service.  Commissioned as a colonel of Engineers in the National Army, he sailed for France in November.  Andrews joined the Service of Supply, and served successively as deputy director of Transportation, Deputy Chief of Utilities, and Deputy Assistant Chief of Staff.  In August 1918, he was appointed Assistant Chief of Staff for Personnel (C-1) on the headquarters staff of the American Expeditionary Forces.  He was promoted to brigadier general in October 1918, and served until returning to the United States and receiving his discharge in May, 1919.

Post-World War I
Following his World War I service, Andrews was appointed a brigadier general in the Organized Reserve Corps, and he served from 1921 until retiring in April, 1926.  He continued to practice law and serve on corporate boards, and he remained active until retiring in 1943 and moving to Winter Park, Florida.  He was president of the Association of Graduates of the United States Military Academy from 1928 to 1931 and served as a trustee of George Washington University and the Grant Memorial Association, and a director of the American Society of the French Legion of Honor.  In 1934 he authored a biography, My Friend and Classmate, John J. Pershing.

Awards and decorations
Andrews' awards included the Army Distinguished Service Medal, the French Legion of Honor (Commander), the Belgian Order of the Crown, and the Italian Order of the Crown. The citation for his Army DSM reads:

Death and legacy 
Andrews died in Winter Park on April 19, 1959.  He was buried in Arlington National Cemetery.

Family
On September 27, 1888, Andrews married Mary Campbell Schofield, the daughter of Lieutenant General John Schofield.  They were the parents of sons Schofield (1889-1971) and Delano Andrews (1894-1958), both of whom were veterans of World War I and prominent attorneys.

References

Sources

Internet

Books

Magazines

1864 births
1959 deaths
United States Army Field Artillery Branch personnel
United States Army Corps of Engineers personnel
Military personnel from New York (state)
People from Massena, New York
People from Winter Park, Florida
United States Military Academy alumni
George Washington University Law School alumni
New York Law School alumni
Lawyers from New York City
New York City Police Commissioners
American military personnel of the Spanish–American War
Adjutants General of New York (state)
United States Army generals of World War I
United States Army generals
American biographers
Recipients of the Distinguished Service Medal (US Army)
Commandeurs of the Légion d'honneur
Recipients of the Order of the Crown (Belgium)
Burials at Arlington National Cemetery